De Boeren Courant was a newspaper that operated from Colesberg in the Cape Colony, from 1871 to 1873.

References

Defunct newspapers published in South Africa
Publications established in 1871
Publications disestablished in 1873
1871 establishments in the Cape Colony